Seema Na Akase (Boundless Sky) is a 2017 Sri Lankan Sinhala romantic film directed by Nihal Bandara and produced by Tissa Balasuriya Arachchi for Active Motion Pictures. It stars Pubudu Chathuranga and newcomer Aruni Mallawarachchi in lead roles along with Dhananji Tharuka and Keshan Shashindra. Music co-composed by Sanka Ruwandika.

The first screening was held on 10 November 2017 at Tharangani Hall of National Film Council on 6.15pm. The film has received positive reviews from critics. It is the 1290th Sri Lankan film in the Sinhala cinema.

Plot

Cast
 Pubudu Chathuranga as Isuru
 Aruni Mallawarachchi as Apeksha
 Dhananji Tharuka as Shavindri
 Keshan Shashindra as Charaka
 Sriyani Amarasena as Isuru's mother
 Buddhadasa Vithanarachchi as Apeksha's father
 Sangeetha Basnayake as Apeksha's mother
 Sanjula Diwaratne as Pasan
 Gayan Hettiarachchi as Sonal
 Nalaka Daluwatte as Dream boy
 Kalpa Kelum as Varuna
 Naleen Kumara as Chirash

Songs
The film included five songs.

References

External links
 සීමා නෑ ආකාසේ එක්ක තිරයට එන අලුත් තරුව

2017 films
2010s Sinhala-language films